Edan Alterman is an Israeli television, film and theater actor.

Biography
Idan Alterman started acting in the theater group קבוצת התיאטרון לנוער
and in בית הכט and after serving in the Israeli Army, in 1992 presented a number of entertainment shows on television most notably 'Platfus' - "Flat Feet") with Avi Grainik and later in films like Deadly Outbreak as Ira, the prison film Layla Lavan (לילה לבן or White Night) as Jonathan, Smicha Hashmalit Ushma Moshe (שמיכה חשמלית ושמה משה) as Noni, and Mar Baum or alternatively 92 Minutes of Mr. Baum (מר באום) and in Time of Favor (Ha-Hesder) as Pini.

Starting 2001, he took part in TV series Kochvey Hashchuna (Neighborhood Stars) on Israeli TV Channel 2 and in 2005 co-hosted a radio show with Yael Leventhal (יעל לבנטל) on רדיו תל אביב Tel Aviv Radio (102 FM). His big break internationally came in 2008 with appearance as Arthur in Adam Resurrected, a film by Paul Schrader. 
 
Thereafter he has become a main actor in Ha-Chaim Ze Lo Hacol (Life Is Not Everything) on Israeli television, where he played the role of Miki Bernstein. This record-popularity continued for 10 seasons from 2001 to 2010.

In 2011, Edan Alterman played and sang one of the major roles in Habima National Theatre musical Natati La Khayay (I Gave Her My Life) based on the songs of Danny Sanderson, co-founder of the iconic Israeli rock band Kaveret. Edan played the role of Yoram Zuckerman in the play.

Edan Alterman is currently developing a musical career most notably as a guest artist, alongside many other artists in the Magical Mystery Tour Band covering Beatles songs.  He also has his own music-and-humour show called "Alt-Shift" where he sings famous songs he translates from English to Hebrew (and one hilarious reverse translation sung Leonard Cohen style).

References

External links

1971 births
Living people
Israeli people of Polish-Jewish descent
Israeli Jews
People from Haifa
Israeli male television actors
Israeli male film actors
Israeli male stage actors
21st-century Israeli male singers